The 2011 Scandinavian Touring Car Championship season was the inaugural Scandinavian Touring Car Championship (STCC) season. The Scandinavian Touring Car Cup was awarded in 2010 to the driver with best results from selected races in the Danish and Swedish seasons.

Teams and drivers
 The championship entry list was released on 16 March 2011.

Race calendar and results
The calendar for the 2011 STCC season was released on 8 November 2010.

Championship standings
The points system used for both the main championship and Semcon Cup is the new FIA system of 25–18–15–12–10–8–6–4–2–1, awarded to the top ten finishers of each race.

Drivers Championship

† — Drivers did not finish the race, but were classified as they completed over 90% of the race distance.

Teams Championship

References

External links
 Official website of the Scandinavian Touring Car Championship

Swedish Touring Car Championship seasons
Scandinavian Touring Car
Scandinavian Touring Car